The 1945–46 1re série season was the 27th season of the 1re série, the top level of ice hockey in France. Three teams participated in the league, and Chamonix Hockey Club won their eleventh championship.

Regular season

External links
Season on hockeyarchives.info

Fra
1945–46 in French ice hockey
Ligue Magnus seasons